Sweet November is a 1968 American romantic comedy film written by Herman Raucher and starring Sandy Dennis, Anthony Newley and Theodore Bikel. The film originally had been written as a stage play by Raucher, but before it was performed, Universal Pictures got wind of the project and paid Raucher $100,000 to stop work on the play and adapt it as a screenplay.

A 2001 remake also titled Sweet November starred Keanu Reeves and Charlize Theron.

Plot 
Successful British box manufacturer Charlie Blake (Anthony Newley) meets Sara Deever (Sandy Dennis) when they both take a driver's exam in New York City. She tries to get a few answers from him, but he gets expelled for cheating. They run into each other later and go out on a date.

When they return to her apartment, Charlie meets Alonzo (Theodore Bikel), Sara's older, vegetarian friend. Then Richard (Sandy Baron) bursts in; he begs her to let him stay with her, but she has already packed his bag. After he leaves, Charlie asks her why Richard referred to him as his successor. She explains that she has a "special therapy program": She takes in a man for no longer than a month to diagnose and fix whatever problem he has. Richard was October, and she wants him to be November. She believes his trouble is his devotion to his work. Charlie accepts, though he is only interested in a short fling. He tells his employee, Digby (King Moody), to send him a telegram after a week so he will have an excuse to leave.

As November progresses, however, Charlie begins to fall in love (for the first time in his life) with the unorthodox Sara. When he gets the prearranged telegram, he telephones Digby to tell him to handle an important business meeting by himself. Clem Batchman (Burr DeBenning), another of Sara's projects, shows up, inciting Charlie's jealousy, until Sara informs him that he just wants to introduce her to his fiancée, Carol (Marj Dusay).

Charlie becomes troubled by certain signs that Sara may be ill. When he asks Alonzo, his worst fears are confirmed: Sara has only a little time left. She lives as she does so that she will be remembered after she is gone. Charlie tries hard to get her to break her self-imposed rule, and believes he has succeeded. She later admits to Alonzo that, unlike all the others, she has fallen for Charlie, but wants him to remember her as she is now. Thus, when December (and a clumsy Gordon) arrives, she has secretly packed November's bag. Charlie reluctantly leaves, promising he will never forget her.

Cast
 Sandy Dennis as Sara Deever
 Anthony Newley as Charlie Blake
 Theodore Bikel as Alonzo
 Burr DeBenning as Clem Batchman
 Sandy Baron as Richard
 Marj Dusay as Carol
 Martin West as Gordon
 Virginia Vincent as Mrs. Schumacher
 King Moody as Digby
 Robert Gibbons as Sam Naylor

Audrey Hepburn originally was announced for the lead.

Home media
On March 22, 2009, the film was released on DVD by Warner Bros.

References

External links
 
 
 
 

1968 films
1960s romantic comedy-drama films
American films based on plays
American romantic comedy-drama films
Films directed by Robert Ellis Miller
Films scored by Michel Legrand
Films set in New York City
Films shot in New York City
Films with screenplays by Herman Raucher
Warner Bros. films
1968 comedy films
1968 drama films
Films produced by Elliott Kastner
1960s English-language films
1960s American films